Metin Sevinç (born 14 June 1994) is a Turkish footballer who plays as an attacking midfielder for TFF Third League club Orduspor 1967. He made his Süper Lig debut on 2 November 2013.

International career
Sevinç represented Turkish national under-19 team at the 2013 Mediterranean Games.

External links
 
 

1994 births
People from Fatih
Footballers from Istanbul
Living people
Turkish footballers
Turkey youth international footballers
Association football midfielders
Kasımpaşa S.K. footballers
Fatih Karagümrük S.K. footballers
Bayrampaşaspor footballers
Fethiyespor footballers
Süper Lig players
TFF Second League players
TFF Third League players
Mediterranean Games silver medalists for Turkey
Mediterranean Games medalists in football
Competitors at the 2013 Mediterranean Games